Joe Adamson is an author of several books, including:
 Groucho, Harpo, Chico and Sometimes Zeppo: A History of the Marx Brothers and a Satire on the Rest of the World
 Tex Avery, King of Cartoons
 Bugs Bunny: 50 Years and Only One Grey Hare
The Walter Lantz Story

Adamson's book on the Marx Brothers is widely considered one of the most important books written about the team.

References

External links

Year of birth missing (living people)
Living people
Historians of animation